Strionautilus is an extinct  nautilus-like genus.

References

Nautiloids